Lyuba Yakimchuk, also known as Lyubov Yakymchuk (born 1985), is a Ukrainian poet, playwright, and screenwriter, living in Kyiv, Ukraine. Her work includes Apricots of Donbas (2015).

Early life and education
Yakimchuk was born and raised in Pervomaisk, Luhansk Oblast, a small coal-mining town near Luhansk in Ukraine's industrial east.

She graduated from the University of Luhansk and the National University of Kyiv-Mohyla Academy.

Life and work
Having moved to Kyiv, Yakimchuk was visiting her parents at their family home in Pervomaisk in 2014 when the area was occupied by Russian separatist forces. Her parents and sister became internally displaced persons. Yakimchuk's book of poems, Apricots of Donbas, focuses on that time and the conflict in the area. Maria G. Rewakowicz wrote in the Los Angeles Review of Books that "Both [Serhiy] Zhadan and Yakimchuk come from the conflict-ridden Donbas and, even though they no longer live there, have emerged as the region's trusted spokespersons."

Her play The Wall was produced at the Ivan Franko National Academic Drama Theater in Kyiv. She wrote the script for the film "Slovo" House: Unfinished Novel (2021), about Ukrainian artists living in the Slovo Building, persecuted by the totalitarian system, against the backdrop of the Holodomor.

 Yakimchuk lives to the north of Kyiv with her husband, Yuriy Barabash, and their 11-year-old son. However, due to the 2022 Russian invasion of Ukraine, for the first month her son resided with relatives. During the invasion, Yakimchuk managed to travel to speak at cultural events in Paris, Warsaw, and St Andrews, and intends to return to Kyiv. At the 2022 Grammy Awards, she performed her poem "Prayer" in English as part of John Legend's performance of his song "Free"; they were joined by Ukrainian artists Siuzanna Iglidan and Mika Newton. Abbey White, for The Hollywood Reporter, highlighted:Legend's performance featured a chorus and a backdrop of images from the crisis in Ukraine, as well as a segment from Lyuba Yakimchuk [...]. In a take on The Lord's Prayer, Yakimchuk described "parents whose house is in the line of fire and who won’t abandon it like a tomb," and said of our daily bread, "give to the hungry." "And forgive us our destroyed cities even though we do not forgive for them our enemies," she continued. "Shoot and protect my husband, my parents, my child and my motherland."

Publications

Books of poetry by Yakimchuk
 (Iak Moda) = Like Fashion. Lviv: Kamenyar, 2009. . In Ukrainian.
Apricots of Donbas
(Abrykosy Donbasu). Lviv: Old Lion, 2015. . In Ukrainian.
. Poznań, Poland: Provincial Public Library and Culture Animation Center, 2018. Polish-language version.
. Allikaäärne, 2019. . Translated by Mathura. Estonian-language version.
Apricots of Donbas. Lost Horse Press Contemporary Ukrainian Poetry. Sandpoint, ID: Lost Horse, 2021. . English translation by Oksana Maksymchuk, Max Rosochinsky, and Svetlana Lavochkina. With an essay by Yakimchuk ("Reaching a Common Language") and an introduction by Maksymchuk and Rosochinsky. English-language version.

In English-language poetry anthologies
The Frontier: 28 Contemporary Ukrainian Poets: An Anthology. Glagoslav, 2018. Edited and translated from the Ukrainian by Anatoly Kudryavitsky. .
The White Chalk of Days: The Contemporary Ukrainian Literature Series Anthology. Academic Studies, 2018. Edited by Marko Andryczyk. .
Words for War: New Poems from Ukraine. Boston: Academic Studies, 2017. Co-edited by Oksana Maksymchuk and Max Rosochinsky.

In other publications
Ukraine: Stop Tanks with Books. Nazraeli, 2022. Photographs by Mark Neville with short stories by Yakimchuk. Edited by David Campany. .

See also
List of Ukrainian-language poets

References

External links

21st-century Ukrainian poets
21st-century Ukrainian women writers
National University of Kyiv-Mohyla Academy alumni
University of Luhansk alumni
People from Luhansk Oblast
Living people
1985 births